Matthew John Crnkovich (born November 10, 1956), known as Matt Craven, is a Canadian character actor. He has appeared in over 40 films including Happy Birthday to Me, Jacob's Ladder, K2, A Few Good Men, The Juror, Assault on Precinct 13, Disturbia, Tempting Fate and X-Men: First Class.

Craven has also made several television appearances, most notably as Clayton Jarvis on the CBS series, NCIS, Officer Lenny Gayer on High Incident, Dr. Tim Lonner on L.A. Doctors, and Sheriff Fred Langston on the series Resurrection.

Early life
Craven, a Canadian, spent his early life in Ontario. His father died six weeks after his birth and Craven ultimately dropped out of high school to work a variety of odd jobs to help support his mother and sister. He was about 20 when he discovered his love for acting - auditioning for, and starring in, a local production of Dracula as Jonathan Harker.

Career
Matt Craven is best known as a character actor working in TV and film. His films include the Academy Award nominated Crimson Tide, A Few Good Men, the SAG nominated X-Men: First Class, Public Enemies, Disturbia, Déjà Vu, The Life of David Gale, Tin Men and K2.  Craven's first film Meatballs opposite Bill Murray was a huge hit and launched Craven's career in film and comedy. Craven's second feature, the live action short Bravery in the Field was nominated for an Academy Award.

The next few years saw Craven starring in several comedy pilots. His first major dramatic film was the drama/horror/mystery cult favorite Jacob's Ladder which follows a haunted Vietnam vet as he attempts to discover his past while suffering from a severe case of dissociation. Craven starred as Michael, a chemist in the Army's chemical warfare division where he worked on a drug that was secretly given to the veteran's unit.

On television, Craven has worked with Steven Spielberg as a series regular on High Incident, on TNT's Nuremberg and Kingfish: A Story of Huey P. Long, opposite Jeff Goldblum on Raines, several seasons on the international hit NCIS, and extensively with producer/writer Graham Yost on Justified, From the Earth to the Moon, The Pacific and Boomtown.  Most recently, Craven starred on the ABC series Resurrection.

Craven had two features for 2015 - Roland Emmerich's Stonewall and Unless in which he stars opposite Catherine Keener.

Filmography

Movies

Television

Personal life
Craven has been married for the past 25 years to Sally Sutton, the makeup artist whom he met on the set of K2. They have two children, Nicholas and Josephine.

Craven is a strong supporter of "One Heart Source" an organisation designed to empower at risk children through education in Africa. He is an avid golfer. In his spare time, he enjoys gardening, cooking and woodworking. He worked as a doorman for the nightclub the Bitter End and is a lifelong fan of the Toronto Maple Leafs.

References

External links

 Meatballs movie website

1956 births
20th-century Canadian male actors
21st-century Canadian male actors
Canadian male film actors
Canadian male stage actors
Canadian male television actors
Canadian male voice actors
Living people
Male actors from Ontario
People from Port Colborne